Palau competed at the 2016 Summer Olympics in Rio de Janeiro, Brazil, from 5 to 21 August 2016. This was the nation's fifth consecutive appearance at the Summer Olympics.

Five athletes, three men and two women, were selected to the Palauan team at the Games, competing only in athletics, swimming, freestyle wrestling, and flatwater canoeing (the country's Olympic debut in Rio de Janeiro). Two of Palau's Olympians returned: sprinter Rodman Teltull (men's 100 metres), and freestyle wrestler Florian Skilang Temengil (men's 125 kg), who reprised his role of leading the Palauan delegation as the nation's flag bearer for the second time in the opening ceremony, since he did so eight years earlier in Beijing. Palau, however, has yet to win its first ever Olympic medal.

Athletics (track & field)

Palau has received one universality slot from IAAF to send one male athlete to the Olympics.

Canoeing

Sprint
Palau has received an invitation from the Tripartite Commission to send a boat in the women's K-1 500 m to the Olympics, signifying the nation's debut in the sport.

Qualification Legend: FA = Qualify to final (medal); FB = Qualify to final B (non-medal)

Swimming

Palau has received a Universality invitation from FINA to send two swimmers (one male and one female) to the Olympics.

Wrestling
 
Palau has received an invitation from the Tripartite Commission to send a wrestler competing in the men's freestyle 125 kg to the Olympics, signifying the nation's comeback to the sport after an eight-year hiatus.

Men's freestyle

References

External links 
 

Olymp
Nations at the 2016 Summer Olympics
2016